Abdul Ghani bin Samsudin (b.1946) is a Malaysian politician who has served as the Member of Parliament (MP) for Tanjong Karang from 2004 to 2008 and Member of Selangor State Legislative Assembly of Sungai Burong from 2008 to 2013. He is a member of the National Trust Party (AMANAH), a component party of the Pakatan Harapan (PH) coalition. He also served as Deputy General Adviser of National Trust Party (AMANAH) since the establishment of the party in 2015.

Education and career 
Abdul Ghani received his early education at Masjid Tanah National School, Melaka and Madrasah Aljunied Al-Islamiah, Singapore before attending Maahad Buuth Islamiyah al Azhar, Egypt (1965–1967). He then continued his studies at Al-Azhar University in Egypt (1967–1974) and obtained a Masters (Sharia) in the field of comparative sects and law.

Upon his return to Malaysia, Abdul Ghani served as a religion teacher at Sekolah Kebangsaan Sekolah Agama Sharifah Rodziah, Malacca. One year teaching in Melaka, he then became a lecturer at Institut Teknologi MARA (ITM), Shah Alam and served for 7 years. In the early 80s, he was transferred to ITM Sabah Branch, Kota Kinabalu. About 6 months later, he was ordered out of Sabah within 48 hours by the Chief Minister, Datuk Harris Salleh and returned to ITM Shah Alam for a while. Then, he moved to the Faculty of Education Universiti Malaya in 1981 until he retired in 2001.

Community and politics 
He was involved in Angkatan Belia Islam Malaysia (ABIM) until he was entrusted as Deputy President in the early 80s. He was also active in the Persatuan Ulama Malaysia (PUM) and was appointed as its President in 1999–2003, replacing Ustaz Ahmad Awang. Later, he also founded and led another ulama organization, the Secretariat of the Association of Ulama Rantau Asia (SHURA). He was also appointed as a Member of the Board of Trustees of Yayasan Dakwah Islamiah Malaysia (YADIM) in 2019 under the leadership of the President, Ustaz Nik Omar Nik Abdul Aziz.

Politics 
Abdul Ghani joined Malaysian Islamic Party after leading ABIM. He was once appointed as a Member of the Central PAS Working Committee and Secretary of PAS Shura Ulama Council (1999–2010). He left PAS in 2015 and joined Malaysian Workers' Party (PPM) before the party changed its name to National Trust Party (AMANAH). Since joining AMANAH, he has been appointed as Deputy General Adviser of the party.

Election results

Awards and recognition 
  :
  Knight Commander of the Exalted Order of Malacca (DCSM) – Datuk Wira (2018)

References

1946 births
Living people
National Trust Party (Malaysia) politicians
Former Malaysian Islamic Party politicians
Malaysian Muslims
Malaysian people of Malay descent